Chuck Klosterman IV: A Decade of Curious People and Dangerous Ideas is a book written by Chuck Klosterman, first published by Scribner in 2006.  It is the fourth book by Klosterman. The paperback edition was released in July 2007. The book consists of three sections: Things That Are True is a collection of previously published interviews with new introductions and footnotes; Things That Might Be True collects previously published opinion articles that include new footnotes and are preceded by hypothetical questions, a literary device Klosterman used in Sex, Drugs, and Cocoa Puffs: A Low Culture Manifesto; and Something That Isn't True At All is the beginning of an unfinished novel written in 2000. This final section is a departure for Klosterman, as it is his first published work of fiction. The main character, Jack, is allegedly based upon Klosterman's personality traits, but the author asserts that the events which occur in the story are completely fictional.

See also
Advanced Genius Theory

References
 (hardcover)

External links
Chuck Klosterman IV at Simon & Schuster
Largehearted Boy Book Notes music playlist by Chuck Kosterman for his book, Chuck Klosterman IV

Reviews
 Review from Publishers Weekly
 Review from The Onion A.V. Club

2006 non-fiction books
Popular culture books
American non-fiction books
Essay collections
Works by Chuck Klosterman